This is a list of compositions by George Gershwin, a Broadway songwriter and a classical composer. His works are grouped thematically in this list, and in chronological order according to the dates of compositions in the same group.

Classical works 
Note: All orchestral/operatic pieces are orchestrated by Gershwin unless otherwise specified.
 Lullaby (1919), a meditative piece for string quartet.  Originally, a class assignment from his music theory teacher.
 Blue Monday (1922), a one-act opera featured in George White's Scandals of 1922 at the Globe Theatre, Paul Whiteman conducting, orchestrated by Will Vodery.
 Reorchestrated by Ferde Grofé and retitled 135th Street in 1925 for a performance at Carnegie Hall.
 A suite from Blue Monday was later arranged for piano by pianist and Gershwin scholar Alicia Zizzo and has been recorded.
 Rhapsody in Blue (1924), Gershwin's most famous classical work, a symphonic jazz composition for Paul Whiteman's jazz band & piano, premiered at Aeolian Hall, New York City, better known in the form orchestrated for full symphonic orchestra. Both versions were orchestrated by Ferde Grofé. Featured in numerous films and commercials.
 Short Story (1925), for violin and piano, an arrangement of two other short pieces originally intended to be included with the Three Preludes. Premiered by Samuel Dushkin at The University Club of New York in New York City.
 Concerto in F (1925), three movements, for piano and orchestra, premiered in Carnegie Hall by the New York Symphony Orchestra, Walter Damrosch conducting.
 I. Allegro
 II. Adagio – Andante con moto – Adagio
 III.  Allegro agitato
 Overture to Strike Up the Band (1927/revised 1930), the longest and most complex of the overtures for Gershwin's broadway shows, several sections are polytonal/atonal
 March from Strike Up the Band (1927) is a very popular musical interlude from the 1927 stage musical of the same title.
 An American in Paris (1928), a symphonic tone poem with elements of jazz and realistic sound effects, premiered in Carnegie Hall by the New York Philharmonic, Walter Damrosch conducting.
 Dream Sequence (1931), a five-minute interlude for orchestra and chorus, meant to portray a mind reeling into the dream state. Also known as The Melting Pot. Different music than the Rhapsody in Rivets sequence, which later was expanded and rescored into the Second Rhapsody. Other musical sequences went unused that Gershwin created for Delicious, as Fox Film Corporation declined to use the rest of his score.
 Second Rhapsody (1931), for piano and orchestra, based on the score for a musical sequence from Delicious (film). Working title for the work was Rhapsody in Rivets. Premiered at the Boston Symphony Hall by the Boston Symphony Orchestra, Serge Koussevitzky conducting.
 Overture to Of Thee I Sing (1931), for orchestra. The shortest Broadway overture written by Gershwin. It is also the least episodic of his overtures. Only two songs are quoted in the overture, the rest are only referenced in fragments and repeating musical cells. Also features Gershwin's only known violin cadenza.
 Cuban Overture (1932), originally titled Rumba, a tone poem featuring elements of native Cuban dance and folk music; score specifies usage of native Cuban instruments, premiered at the Lewisohn Stadium of the City University of New York, Gershwin conducting.
 Variations on "I Got Rhythm" (1934), a set of interesting variations on his famous song, for piano and orchestra. Premiered at the Boston Symphony Hall by the Leo Reisman Orchestra, conducted by Charles Previn.
 Includes a waltz, an atonal fugue, and experimentation with Asian and jazz influences
 Porgy and Bess, a folk opera (1935) (from the book by DuBose Heyward) about African-American life, now considered a definitive work of the American theater, premiered at Boston's Colonial Theater, Alexander Smallens conducting.
 Contains the famous aria "Summertime", in addition to hits like "I Got Plenty o' Nuttin'" and "It Ain't Necessarily So".
 Porgy and Bess has also been frequently heard in the concert hall, one suite fashioned by Robert Russell Bennett, Porgy and Bess: A Symphonic Picture is relatively popular.
 Catfish Row (1936),  a 5-movement suite based on material cut from Porgy and Bess before its Broadway premiere.
 I. Catfish Row
 II. Porgy Sings
 III. Fugue
 IV. Hurricane
 V. Good Morning, Brother
 Score to Shall We Dance (1937 film) (1937). This was the first full movie score composed and orchestrated by Gershwin, excluding the score for Delicious which was almost completely rejected by Fox Studios. This massive score includes a final extended 8-minute orchestral passage based on the title song with an intriguing coda hinting at Gershwin forging a new musical path.
 Hoctor's Ballet. This piece features glissandos, rapid shifts in key, and the most extensive parts Gershwin wrote for the harp; written by Gershwin specifically for the ballerina Harriet Hoctor.
 Premiere live concert performance of Hoctor's Ballet occurred on July 28, 2007 at the Severance Hall Pavilion in Cleveland, Ohio; Loras John Schissel conducting the Blossom Festival Orchestra.
 Walking the Dog,  a humorous piece for chamber orchestra featuring the clarinet and the piano. Besides Hoctor's Ballet, this is the only published musical sequence from the movie Shall We Dance. Originally entitled "Promenade."
 Other purely orchestral pieces from the score that remain unpublished include:
 Overture to Shall We Dance, a propulsive, frenetic movement in Gershwin's urban music mode;
 Waltz of the Red Balloons, a waltz with unusual tonalities;
 Rehearsal Fragments;
 Rumba Sequence, music completely different from the Cuban Overture;
 (I've Got) Beginner's Luck (dance), written to accompany a scene of Astaire's rehearsing to a "record" which eventually skips;
 They Can't Take That Away from Me: this sequence is in the form of a foxtrot, one of Gershwin's favorites from the score;
 Slap that Bass, a sparse musical sequence focusing on the rhythm sections of the orchestra;
 They All Laughed;
 Dance of the Waves, a barcarole;
 Graceful and Elegant, a pas de deux;
 French Ballet Class (for two pianos), a galop: only about 20 seconds of this was used for the film;
 Shall We Dance/Finale & Coda, technically a continuation of the Hoctor's Ballet scene, but often noted as a separate musical number;
 Unknown Spanish Sequence: Gershwin composed a movement for the finale that went unused after he played it for the director; only exists in short score.
 The score is over an hour in length, the longest of all of Gershwin's orchestral works. Other musical numbers not listed here have vocals, but these can be omitted for live performance as vocal lines are doubled on other instruments.  All other vocal/orchestral arrangements in the rest of the numbers were by Gershwin, with Robert Russell Bennett and Nat Shilkret acting under Gershwin's direction as assistants in the orchestration process of a few scenes in order to meet deadlines. 
 Most of the musicals Gershwin wrote are also known for their instrumental music, especially the overtures to many of his later shows.

Overtures 

 1922 - Blue Monday*
 1924 - Lady, Be Good!*
 1925 - Tip-Toes* 
 1926 - Oh, Kay!**
 1927/ rev. 1930 - Strike Up The Band***
 1927 - Funny Face**
 1928 - Primrose* 
 1930 - Girl Crazy**
 1931 - Of Thee I Sing**
 1933 - Pardon My English**
 1933 - Let 'Em Eat Cake**
 * orchestrated for pit orchestra
 ** augmented instrumentation for symphony orchestra by Don Rose: 2 flutes, piccolo, 2 oboes, English horn, 2 clarinets, bass clarinet, 2 bassoons, contrabassoon, alto saxophone, 4 horns, 3 trumpets, 2 trombones, bass trombone, tuba, timpani, 4 percussion, harp, piano, strings
 ***  full orchestration with celesta

 Solo Works for Piano 
 Tango, (1915) for solo piano. Written when he was 15.
 Rialto Ripples, (1917)  a short ragtime piece for piano.
 Limehouse Nights (unknown date, early) a short ragtime piece for piano.
 Three-Quarter Blues, (1923) also known as the Irish Waltz.
 Prelude (unnumbered), (1923)  – Rubato – Gershwin originally intended this prelude to be included with the Three Preludes. Unpublished.
 Novelette in Fourths (1919), a prelude, but more specifically a "cake-walk" (not a rag) in E-flat, possibly conceived as one of the 24 intended preludes in the composer's "melting pot" plan; some of the music was rearranged and used as part of Short Story, a piece written for piano and solo violin
 Fascinating Rhythm (1924) Lyrics by Ira Gershwin
 Romantic, (1925) Short piano fragment. Also known as Melody #55. Unpublished.
 Melody No. 17 (1925–1926) Another piece originally intended to be included with the Piano Preludes.
 Three Preludes, (1926)  first performed by Gershwin at the Roosevelt Hotel in New York City:
 I. Allegro ben ritmato e deciso
 II. Andante con moto 
 III. Agitato (as marked in the manuscript)
 Swiss Miss, (1926) arrangement of a song from Lady, Be Good Machinery Gone Mad, (1927) unpublished
 Blue Monday, (1927) a piano suite based on Gershwin's one-act opera of the same name
 Merry Andrew, (1928) arrangement of a dance piece from Rosalie Three-Note Waltz, (1931) Also known as Melody #36. Unpublished.
 Piano Transcriptions of Eight Songs (1932)
 George Gershwin’s Song-Book (1932), complex arrangements of 18 Gershwin songs
 the 1932 hardbound editions contained original artwork by Constantin Alajalov for the 18 songs
 a 19th song was enclosed with the 500 signed/numbered copies of the 1932 first edition: Mischa, Yascha, Toscha, Sascha For Lily Pons, (1934) unpublished piece originally intended as accompaniment to an unwritten operatic solo. (Melody #79)
 French Ballet Class (for two pianos) (1937), for two pianos, unpublished music from the film score for Shall We Dance Impromptu in Two Keys, published posthumously in (1973), for piano
 Two Waltzes in C, published posthumously in (1975), for piano
 Originally a two-piano interlude in Pardon My English on Broadway.
 Sleepless Night, unpublished
 Sutton Place, unpublished (Melody #59)

 Musical theater credits Note: All works are musicals produced on Broadway unless specified otherwise. 1919 – La La Lucille (lyrics by Arthur Jackson, B. G. DeSylva and Irving Caesar)
 1919 – Morris Gest's "Midnight Whirl" (lyrics by B. G. DeSylva and John Henry Mears)
 1920 – George White's Scandals of 1920 (lyrics by Arthur Jackson)
 1921 – A Dangerous Maid (lyrics by Ira Gershwin). Premiered in Atlantic City.
 1921 – The Broadway Whirl (co-composed with Harry Tierney, lyrics by Buddy DeSylva, Joseph McCarthy, Richard Carle and John Henry Mears)
 1921 – George White's Scandals of 1921 (lyrics by Arthur Jackson, features the song South Sea Isles)
 1922 – George White's Scandals of 1922 (lyrics by E. Ray Goetz, Ira Gershwin and B. G. DeSylva)
 The premiere performance featured the one-act opera Blue Monday with libretto and lyrics by B. G. DeSylva, set in Harlem in a jazz idiom. However, after only one performance, the opera was withdrawn from the show. Gershwin also wrote seven other songs for the show.
 1922 – Our Nell (co-composed with William Daly, lyrics co-written by Gershwin and Daly)
 1922 – By and By (lyrics by Brian Hooker)
 1923 – Innocent Ingenue Baby (co-composed with William Daly, lyrics by Brian Hooker)
 1923 – Walking Home with Angeline (lyrics by Brian Hooker)
 1923 – The Rainbow (lyrics by Clifford Grey and Brian Hooker). Premiered in London.
 1923 – George White's Scandals of 1923 (lyrics by E. Ray Goetz, B. G. DeSylva and Ballard MacDonald)
 1924 – Sweet Little Devil (lyrics by B. G. DeSylva)
 1924 – George White's Scandals of 1924 (lyrics by B. G. DeSylva and Ballard MacDonald)
 1924 – Primrose (lyrics by Desmond Carter and Ira Gershwin). Premiered in London.
 1924 – Lady, Be Good! (lyrics by Ira Gershwin)
 1925 – Tell Me More! (lyrics by Ira Gershwin and B. G. DeSylva)
 1925 – Tip-Toes (lyrics by Ira Gershwin)
 1925 – Song of the Flame (operetta, lyrics by Otto Harbach and Oscar Hammerstein II, and musical collaboration by Herbert Stothart)
 1926 – Oh, Kay! (lyrics by Ira Gershwin and Howard Dietz)
 Includes the famous song, "Someone to Watch Over Me"
 Revived in 1928 and 1990 (the latter with an all-Black cast)
 1927 – Strike Up the Band (lyrics by Ira Gershwin). Premiered in Philadelphia.
 Revised and produced on Broadway in 1930
 1927 – Funny Face (lyrics by Ira Gershwin)
 1928 – Rosalie (lyrics by Ira Gershwin and P. G. Wodehouse, co-composed with Sigmund Romberg)
 1928 – Treasure Girl (lyrics by Ira Gershwin)
 1929 – Show Girl (lyrics by Ira Gershwin and Gus Kahn)
 1930 – Girl Crazy (lyrics by Ira Gershwin)
 1931 – Of Thee I Sing (lyrics by Ira Gershwin)
 Awarded the Pulitzer Prize for Drama for 1932 and was the first musical to win that award, although only Ira Gershwin and the bookwriters were awarded the Prize and not George Gershwin
 Revived in 1933 and 1952
 1933 – Pardon My English (lyrics by Ira Gershwin)
 1933 – Let 'Em Eat Cake (lyrics by Ira Gershwin), sequel to Of Thee I Sing 1935 – Porgy and Bess (lyrics by Ira Gershwin and DuBose Heyward)
 Revived on Broadway in 1942, 1943, 1953, 1976 (Houston Grand Opera winner of the Tony Award for Most Innovative Revival of a Musical), 1983, and 2012

Works featuring original Gershwin songs for shows by other composers
 1916 – The Passing Show of 1916 – "The Making of a Girl" (co-composed with Sigmund Romberg, lyrics by Harold Atteridge); "My Runaway Girl" (lyrics by Murray Roth)
 1918 – Hitchy-Koo of 1918  – "You-oo Just You" (lyrics by Irving Caesar)
 1918 – Ladies First – "The Real American Folk Song (is a Rag)" (lyrics by Ira Gershwin); "Some Wonderful Sort of Someone" (lyrics by Schuyler Greene)
 1918 – Half-Past Eight – "There's Magic in the Air" (lyrics by Ira Gershwin); "The Ten Commandments of Love", "Cupid" and "Hong Kong" (lyrics by Edward B. Perkins)
 1919 – Good Morning, Judge – "I Was So Young (You Were So Beautiful)" (lyrics by Irving Caesar and Alfred Bryan); "There’s More to the Kiss than the X-X-X" (lyrics by Irving Caesar)
 1919 – The Lady in Red – "Some Wonderful Sort of Someone" (lyrics by Schyler Greene); "Something about Love" (lyrics by Lou Paley)
 1919 – Demi-Tasse Capitol Revue – "Come to the Moon" (lyrics by Lou Paley and Ned Wayburn); "Swanee" (lyrics by Irving Caesar)
 1920 – Dere Mabel – "We’re Pals" (lyrics by Irving Caesar), first performed in Baltimore; "Back Home" and "I Don't Know Why (When I Dance with You)" (lyrics by Irving Caesar)
 1920 – Ed Wynn's Carnival – "Oo, How I Love You To Be Loved by You" (lyrics by Lou Paley)
 1920 – The Sweetheart Shop – "Waiting for the Sun to Come Out" (lyrics by Ira Gershwin)
 1920 – Sinbad – "Swanee" (lyrics by Irving Caesar). As performed by Al Jolson
 1920 – Broadway Brevities of 1920 – "Lu Lu" and "Snowflakes" (lyrics by Arthur Jackson); "Spanish Love" (lyrics by Irving Caesar)
 1920 – Piccadilly to Broadway (songs unpublished)
 1921 – Blue Eyes (songs unpublished)
 1921 – Selwyn's Snapshots of 1921 – "On the Brim of Her Old-Fashioned Bonnet", "The Baby Blues" and "Futuristic Melody" (lyrics by E. Ray Goetz, songs unpublished)
 1921 – The Perfect Fool – "My Log-Cabin Home" (lyrics by Irving Caesar and Buddy De Sylva); "No One Else but that Girl of Mine" (lyrics by Irving Caesar)
 1922 – The French Doll – "Do It Again" (lyrics by Buddy De Sylva)
 1922 – For Goodness Sake – "Someone" and "Tra-la-la" (lyrics by Ira Gershwin)
 1922 – Spice of 1922 – "The Yankee Doodle Blues" (lyrics by Irving Caesar and Buddy De Sylva)
 1922 – The Dancing Girl – "That American Boy of Mine" (lyrics by Irving Caesar)
 1923 – Little Miss Bluebeard – "I Won’t Say I Will, But I Won’t Say I Won’t" (lyrics by Ira Gershwin and Buddy De Sylva)
 1923 – Nifties of 1923 – "At Half-Past Seven" (lyrics by Buddy De Sylva); "Nashville Nightingale" (lyrics by Irving Caesar)
 1926 – Americana – "That Lost Barber Shop Chord" (lyrics by Ira Gershwin)
 1930 – Nine-Fifteen Revue – "Toddlin' Along" (lyrics by Ira Gershwin)
 1936 – The Show Is On – "By Strauss" (lyrics by Ira Gershwin). Revived in 1937

Works interpolating Gershwin songs posthumously
 1953 – At Home With Ethel Waters – "Oh, Lady be Good!"
 1956 – Mr. Wonderful, starring Sammy Davis Jr. — "Liza", original from Show Girl 1967 – "I Got Rhythm" a hit single for pop vocal group The Happenings
 1983 – My One and Only – an adaptation of the music from Funny Face 1986 – Uptown...It's Hot! – "Oh, Lady be Good!"
 1992 – Crazy for You – musical adapting George and Ira Gershwin Tin Pan Alley and Broadway songs
 Awarded the Tony Award for Best Musical
 1999 – The Gershwins' Fascinating Rhythm – revue with songs by George and Ira Gershwin
 2001 – George Gershwin Alone – one-man play by Hershey Felder, who portrayed Gershwin, incorporating "Swanee" from Sinbad (lyrics by Irving Caesar), "Embraceable You" from Girl Crazy (lyrics by Ira Gershwin), "Someone to Watch Over Me" from Oh, Kay! (lyrics by Ira Gershwin), "Bess, You is My Woman Now" from Porgy and Bess (lyrics by DuBose Heyward and Ira Gershwin), An American in Paris and Rhapsody in Blue.
 2002 – Elaine Stritch at Liberty – But Not For Me 2002 – Back from Broadway – one-time concert featuring songs by George Gershwin
 2010 – Brian Wilson Reimagines Gershwin – two incomplete pieces by Gershwin finished by Brian Wilson and 12 other reimagined Gershwin classics

Miscellaneous songs
 1916 – When You Want ’Em, You Can’t Get ’Em (When You’ve Got ’Em, You Don’t Want ’Em) (lyrics by Murray Roth)
 1917 – Beautiful Bird (lyrics by Ira Gershwin and Lou Paley)
 1917 – When There's a Chance To Dance (lyrics by Ira Gershwin)
 1918 – Gush-Gush-Gushing (lyrics by Ira Gershwin)
 1918 – When the Armies Disband (lyrics by Irving Caesar)
 1918 – Good Little Tune (lyrics by Irving Caesar)
 1919 – The Love of a Wife (lyrics by Arthur Jackson and B. G. DeSylva)
 1919 – O Land of Mine, America (lyrics by Michael E. Rourke). A national anthem submission for a New York American competition offering five thousand dollars to the winner. Gershwin received the lowest prize of fifty dollars.
 1920 – Yan-Kee (lyrics by Irving Caesar)
 1921 – Phoebe (lyrics by Ira Gershwin and Lou Paley)
 1921 – Something Peculiar (lyrics by Ira Gershwin and Lou Paley)
 1921 – Dixie Rose (lyrics by Irving Caesar and B. G. DeSylva)
 1921 – In the Heart of a Geisha (lyrics by Fred Fisher)
 1921 – Swanee Rose (lyrics by Irving Caesar and B. G. DeSylva)
 1921 – Tomale (I’m Hot for You) (lyrics by B. G. DeSylva)
 c.1921 – Molly-on-the-Shore (lyrics by Ira Gershwin)
 c.1921 – Mischa, Yascha, Toscha, Sascha (lyrics by Ira Gershwin)
 This is Gershwin's only finished work based on a Jewish theme, and the title is a reference to the first names of four Jewish-Russian violinists, Mischa Elman, Jascha Heifetz, Toscha Seidel and Sascha Jacobsen.
 1922 – The Flapper (co-composed with William Daly, lyrics by B. G. DeSylva)
 1925 – Harlem River Chanty and It’s a great little world! (lyrics by Ira Gershwin, originally composed for Tip-Toes on Broadway but not used)
 1925 – Murderous Monty (and Light-Fingered Jane) (lyrics by Desmond Carter, composed for London production of Tell Me More.)
 1926 – I’d Rather Charleston (lyrics by Desmond Carter, composed for London production of Lady Be Good.)
 1928 – Beautiful gypsy and Rosalie (originally composed for Rosalie on Broadway, but not used)
 1929 – Feeling Sentimental (originally composed for Show Girl on Broadway, but not used)
 1929 – In the Mandarin’s Orchid Garden 1932 – You’ve Got What Gets Me (composed for the first film version of Girl Crazy.
 1933 – Till Then 1936 – King of Swing (lyrics by Al Stillman)
 1936 – Strike Up the Band for U.C.L.A (to the same music as the song "Strike Up the Band")
 1937 – Hi-Ho! (lyrics by Ira Gershwin, originally composed for Shall We Dance, but not used)
 1938 – Just Another Rhumba (lyrics by Ira Gershwin, originally composed for The Goldwyn Follies, but not used)
 1938 – Dawn of a New Day Musical films 
Music by George Gershwin, lyrics by Ira Gershwin
 1923 – The Sunshine Trail (title song of silent film with accompaniment music)
 1931 – Delicious 1937 – Shall We Dance 1937 – A Damsel in Distress 1938 – The Goldwyn Follies (Gershwin died during filming; Vernon Duke completed and adapted Gershwin's songs, and composed additional ones)
 1947 – The Shocking Miss Pilgrim (Kay Swift adapted a number of unpublished Gershwin melodies)
 1951 – An American in Paris (title and theme song)
 1964 – Kiss Me, Stupid'' (adaptations of unpublished Gershwin songs)

References 

 
Gershwin, George, compositions by